Bear Lake is a borough in Warren County, Pennsylvania, United States. The population was 193 at the 2000 census.

Geography
Bear Lake is located at  (41.992823, -79.505610).

Demographics

As of the census of 2000, there were 193 people, 66 households, and 55 families residing in the borough. The population density was 277.1 people per square mile (106.5/km2). There were 74 housing units at an average density of 106.3 per square mile (40.8/km2). The racial makeup of the borough was 100.00% White. Hispanic or Latino of any race were 0.52% of the population.

There were 66 households, out of which 39.4% had children under the age of 18 living with them, 72.7% were married couples living together, 10.6% had a female householder with no husband present, and 15.2% were non-families. 12.1% of all households were made up of individuals, and 4.5% had someone living alone who was 65 years of age or older. The average household size was 2.92 and the average family size was 3.18.

In the borough the population was spread out, with 26.4% under the age of 18, 5.7% from 18 to 24, 29.5% from 25 to 44, 23.3% from 45 to 64, and 15.0% who were 65 years of age or older. The median age was 38 years. For every 100 females there were 103.2 males. For every 100 females age 18 and over, there were 100.0 males.

The median income for a household in the borough was $28,036, and the median income for a family was $28,929. Males had a median income of $24,792 versus $19,000 for females. The per capita income for the borough was $10,329. About 3.7% of families and 3.3% of the population were below the poverty line, including none of those under the age of eighteen or sixty five or over.

References

Boroughs in Warren County, Pennsylvania
Populated places established in 1887
1997 establishments in Pennsylvania